The IWRF Asia-Oceania Championship or IWRF Asia-Oceania Zone Championship is the Asian-Oceanian wheelchair rugby championships that take place every two years between national teams of the continents. The Asia-Oceania Championship is also a qualifying tournament for the IWRF World Championships and the Paralympic Games.

Before 2009 the tournament was known as the Oceania Championship. The first Oceania Championship was held in 2001.

Due to the lack of another teams in Africa, the South Africa is also competing in this championship. Canada was part of the tournament in 2007, but is since 2009 part of the IWRF Americas Championship.

Summaries

* = Oceania Championship

Championships per nation

Participation details

* = Oceania Championship

See also
 Wheelchair Rugby World Championships
 IWRF European Championship
 IWRF Americas Championship
 Asian Championship

References

Japan team profile, Canadian Wheelchair Sports Association (CWSA)
Wheel Blacks Looking To Boost World Rankings, Voxy.co.nz, November 2, 2009
News Updates - Oceania Wheelchair Rugby Championships, Paralympics New Zealand, November 26, 2001, Archive copy at the Wayback Machine
Tim Johnson, tvnz.co.nz
Oceana Zonal Championships - Chiba, Japan - September 5-7, 2003, United States Quad Rugby Association (USQRA), Archive copy at the Wayback Machine
2005 Oceania Zonals, Wheel Blacks

Wheel Blacks Work Hard For Final Win, business.highbeam.com, article from: New Zealand Press Association, December 4, 2005
2007 Oceania Wheelchair Rugby Championships, Canadian Wheelchair Sports Association (CWSA)
2009 Asia Oceania Zone Championships, Wheel Blacks
2011 Asia-Oceania Championships to be held in Seoul, Korea, International Wheelchair Rugby Federation, June 8, 2010

Asia-Oceania Championship
Recurring sporting events established in 2001
Rugby union competitions in Asia for national teams
Rugby union competitions in Oceania for national teams
2001 establishments in Asia
2001 establishments in Oceania